Piero is an Italian given name. Notable people with the name include:

Piero Angela (1928–2022), Italian television host
Piero Barucci (born 1933), Italian academic and politician
Piero del Pollaiuolo (c. 1443–1496), Italian painter
Piero della Francesca (c1415–1492), Italian artist of the Early Renaissance
Piero De Benedictis (born 1945), Italian-born Argentine and Colombian folk singer
Piero Ciampi (1934–1980), Italian singer
Piero di Cosimo (1462-1522), also known as Piero di Lorenzo, Italian Renaissance painter
Piero di Cosimo de' Medici (1416–1469), de facto ruler of Florence from 1464 to 1469
Piero Ferrari (born 1945), Italian businessman
Piero Focaccia (born 1944), Italian pop singer
Piero Fornasetti (1913–1988), Italian painter
Piero Gardoni (1934–1994), Italian professional footballer
Piero Golia (born 1974), Italian conceptual artist
Piero Gros (born 1954), Italian alpine skier
Piero the Unfortunate (1472–1503), Gran maestro of Florence
Piero Mingoia (born 1991), English footballer
Piero Manzoni (1933–1963), Italian artist
Piero Pelù (born 1962), Italian singer
Piero Sraffa (1898–1983), Italian economist
Piero Scaruffi (born 1955), Italian-American freelance software consultant and university lecturer
Piero Soderini (1450–1522), Italian statesman
Maestro Piero (c. 1300–c. 1350), known as Piero, Italian medieval composer
Piero Umiliani (1926–2001), Italian composer

See also 

 San Piero (disambiguation)
 Pierino (given name)
 Del Piero

Italian masculine given names